The 2012–13 UC Irvine Anteaters men's basketball team represented the University of California, Irvine during the 2012–13 NCAA Division I men's basketball season. The Anteaters, led by third year head coach Russell Turner, played their home games at the Bren Events Center and were members of the Big West Conference. They finished the season 21–16, 11–7 in Big West play to finish in fourth place. They advanced to the championship game of the Big West tournament where they lost to Pacific. They were invited to the 2013 CIT where they defeated High Point in the first round before losing in the second round to Oral Roberts.

Off-Season

2012 Recruiting Class

Roster

Schedule

|-
!colspan=9 style=| Exhibition

|-
!colspan=9 style=| Regular Season

|-
!colspan=9 style=| Big West tournament

|-
!colspan=9  style=| CIT

References

UC Irvine Anteaters men's basketball seasons
UC Irvine
UC Irvine
UC Irvine Anteaters
UC Irvine Anteaters